Isyakayevo (İśäkäy) is a rural locality (a village) in Makarovsky Selsoviet, Ishimbaysky District, Bashkortostan, Russia. The population was 251 as of 2010. There are 3 streets.

Geography 
Isyakayevo is located 53 km northeast of Ishimbay (the district's administrative centre) by road. Ibrayevo is the nearest rural locality.

References 

Rural localities in Ishimbaysky District